Turkey took part in the Eurovision Song Contest 1984. The country was represented by a music group named Beş Yıl Önce, On Yıl Sonra with the song "Halay", written by Ülkü Aker and composed by Selçuk Başar.

Before Eurovision

8. Eurovision Şarkı Yarışması Türkiye Finali 
The final took place on 25 February 1984 at the TRT Studios in Istanbul, hosted by Başak Doğru. Ten songs competed and the winner was determined by an expert jury. 

According to the regulations the winner had to get at least 15 points. However at the end of the first voting no participant received the number of points required. Therefore a second round took place, with "Halay" performed by Beş Yıl Önce, On Yıl Sonra (which were ranked the third in the first voting) receiving the most points, and was thus determined as the winner. During the final, the group was accompanied by Arif Sağ, the renowned bağlama virtuoso.

At Eurovision
On the night of the contest Beş Yıl Önce On Yıl Sonra performed 15th in the running order following Germany and preceding Finland. In the final they were not accompanied by Arif sağ. At the close of the voting Halay had received 37 points placing Turkey 12th. 8 participants had voted for Halay. This was the best result Turkey ever had in Eurovision up to 1984. The Turkish jury awarded its 12 points to Spain.

Voting

References

1984
Countries in the Eurovision Song Contest 1984
Eurovision